Jiban Maran (Bengali জীবন মরণ, Life and Death) is a social drama film directed by Nitin Bose, made in 1939 in Bengali language and was remade in Hindi as Dushman, and was produced by New Theatres.

Cast 
K. L. Saigal as Mohan
Leela Desai as Geeta
Bhanu Bandopadhyay as Dr. Bijoy
Amar Mullick as Radio Manager Mr Sen
Shailen Chowdhury as Sanitorium Chief Doctor Dr.Choudhury
Indu Mukhopadyay as Geeta's Father
Nivanani as Geets's mother
Boken Chattopadhyay
Jagdish Sethi
Satya Mukherjee as Manager's assistant
Shyam Laha

External links 

 Jiban Maran on indiancine.ma

1938 films
Articles containing video clips
Bengali-language Indian films
1930s Hindi-language films
Indian drama films
1938 drama films
Indian black-and-white films
1930s Bengali-language films
Films scored by Pankaj Mullick